The Hawthorn M (or Mansfield) Class were a class of two destroyers built for the Royal Navy under the pre-war 1913-14 Programme for World War I service.

They were similar to the Admiralty M class, but completed to a modified design by Hawthorn Leslie and Company, Hebburn on Tyne. They had four funnels instead of the three funnels of the Admiralty design; as a consequence, they were the last four-funnelled destroyers (apart from Leaders) to be built for the Royal Navy. The midships 4 inch gun was shipped between the second and third funnels. Both ships were laid down on 9 July 1914 and completed in 1915. Both survived the war and were scrapped in 1921,

Hawthorn Leslie subsequently received orders for two further M class destroyers as part of the large batch of orders placed in May 1915, but these two - Pidgeon and Plover - were built to the Admiralty M class design.

Ships 
 , launched 21 August 1914, completed January 1915, sold for breaking up 9 May 1921 to Thos. W. Ward at Hayle.
 , launched 3 December 1914, completed April 1915, sold for breaking up 26 October 1921 to Barking Ship Breaking Company.

Bibliography
 Destroyers of the Royal Navy, 1893-1981, Maurice Cocker, 1983, Ian Allan 
 Jane's Fighting Ships, 1919, Jane's Publishing

M class destroyer Hawthorn
 
Ship classes of the Royal Navy